Elias Joao da Costa Ximenes Mesquita (born 27 March 2002) is an East Timorese professional footballer who plays as a forward for Lalenok United.

Career statistics

International

References

External links
 
 Elias Mesquita at the Asian Football Confederation

2002 births
Living people
East Timorese footballers
Timor-Leste international footballers
Association football forwards
Lalenok United F.C. players
Competitors at the 2021 Southeast Asian Games
Southeast Asian Games competitors for East Timor